Great Leighs is a village and former civil parish, now in the parish of Great and Little Leighs, in the Chelmsford district of Essex, England, halfway between Chelmsford itself and Braintree. In 1931 the parish had a population of 728.

History
Great Leighs is the location of arguably the oldest Inn in England. The Castle was called the St. Anne's Castle until its temporary closure for refurbishment at Easter 2015. It was on the junction of Main Road and Boreham Road. Another Pub, the Dog & Partridge, is at the other end of the village, on Main Road.

The full history of The Castle has been lost. However, it is mentioned in the Domesday Book of 1086 and claims to be the oldest licensed premises in England, as it served ale to the pilgrims travelling to Thomas Becket's tomb in the 12th Century. It has been an alehouse since the Middle Ages although at some point it was an hermitage.

The current state of the exterior is due to a fire over a hundred years ago which destroyed the original thatched roof, which was replaced with tiles. Inside, timbers date back hundreds of years. Down in the cellars are remains of tunnels, which reputedly linked the inn with the nearby Leez Priory, and Great Leigh's church.

At The Castle, various references can be read on the walls that tell more of the history. Local folklore also tells that the inn is haunted by the troubled spirit of a witch burned at the stake and buried beneath a stone at the nearby crossroads.

In December 2009, a £730,000 project to renovate the Village Hall was completed. It was aided by money associated with a new housing development within the village, extensive fund raising and help from funding bodies and Essex County Council.

The incumbent priest during the First World War, Andrew Clark, kept a voluminous diary of the war detailing activities, opinions and rumours in the village and nearby. An edited version of the diary was published in 1985 under the title Echoes of the Great War.

In the 2014 BBC series Britain's Great War Jeremy Paxman visits St Mary's Church, Great Leighs, and he describes the early loss of Captain Alan Tritton and brothers Privates Richard (Dick) and Arthur Fitch. He speaks with their niece, Valerie Frost.

There is a spring by the side of the road at Cole Hill on Boreham Road, near Great Leighs Church. It once had a lion's head over the outlet. 

On 1 April 1949 the parish was abolished and merged with Little Leighs to form "Great and Little Leighs", part also went to Little Waltham.

Racecourse
In 2008, Great Leighs became home to the first new racecourse in 80 years, when the nearby Essex County Showground was converted into a state-of-the-art horse-racing venue. Great Leighs Racecourse held its first race meeting on 20 April 2008 and staged its first meeting fully open to the public from 28 to 29 May 2008. However, the course had its temporary licence revoked on 16 January 2009 and did not see racing again until 11 January 2015.

References

External links

 Great and Little Leighs Parish Council 
 Leighs Village Hall
 Churches at the Leighs and Lt. Waltham
 The War Memorials at the Churches of Gt. & Lt. Leighs and Lt. Waltham
 Great Leighs War Memorial, including video clip from the BBC series "Britain's Great War"
 Great Leighs St Mary on Essex Churches

 
Villages in Essex
Former civil parishes in Essex